Shelby County is a county located in the U.S. state of Iowa. As of the 2020 census, the population was 11,746. The county seat is Harlan. Its name is in honor of Isaac Shelby, the first Governor of Kentucky.

History
Shelby County was established on January 15, 1851. It was named after General Isaac Shelby, a hero in the American Revolutionary War and the first Governor of Kentucky.

Early settling in Shelby County began in 1848 in Galland's Grove. On February 4, 1855, Shelbyville was designated the county seat. In April, 1859, the seat was moved to Harlan.  One year later the first courthouse was erected and a second courthouse was constructed in 1875.  In 1892, the construction of the present courthouse was begun, this time of stone and three storeys high.  The construction was completed in 1893 with the dedication on September 14. The 1892 Shelby County Courthouse and the surrounding buildings are all listed in the National Register of Historic places effective September 23, 1994. In 1978, the building was extensively restored and still serves as the courthouse.

Geography

Major highways
 U.S. Highway 59
 Iowa Highway 37
 Iowa Highway 44
 Iowa Highway 173
 Iowa Highway 191
County Highway M16
County Highway F58
County Highway F32
County Highway F24
County Highway M36

Attractions
Shelby County Speedway

Adjacent counties
Crawford County  (north)
Audubon County  (east)
Cass County  (southeast)
Pottawattamie County  (south)
Harrison County  (west)

Demographics

2020 census
There were 5,421 housing units, of which 4,981 were occupied.

2010 census
There were 5,542 housing units, of which 5,085 were occupied.

2000 census

As of the census of 2000, there were 13,173 people, 5,173 households, and 3,703 families residing in the county.  The population density was 22 people per square mile (9/km2).  There were 5,459 housing units at an average density of 9 per square mile (4/km2).  The racial makeup of the county was 98.68% White, 0.10% Black or African American, 0.29% Native American, 0.27% Asian, 0.18% from other races, and 0.48% from two or more races.  0.67% of the population were Hispanic or Latino of any race.

There were 5,173 households, out of which 32.60% had children under the age of 18 living with them, 62.30% were married couples living together, 6.80% had a female householder with no husband present, and 28.40% were non-families. 25.20% of all households were made up of individuals, and 13.60% had someone living alone who was 65 years of age or older.  The average household size was 2.49 and the average family size was 2.99.

In the county, the population was spread out, with 26.40% under the age of 18, 5.70% from 18 to 24, 25.20% from 25 to 44, 22.40% from 45 to 64, and 20.40% who were 65 years of age or older.  The median age was 40 years. For every 100 females there were 95.90 males.  For every 100 females age 18 and over, there were 93.30 males.

The median income for a household in the county was $37,442, and the median income for a family was $44,681. Males had a median income of $29,402 versus $20,296 for females. The per capita income for the county was $16,969.  About 4.30% of families and 6.00% of the population were below the poverty line, including 6.00% of those under age 18 and 7.60% of those age 65 or over.

Communities

Cities

Defiance
Earling
Elk Horn
Harlan
Irwin
Kirkman
Panama
Portsmouth
Shelby
Tennant
Westphalia

Census-designated places
Corley
Jacksonville

Other unincorporated places
Botna
Red Line
Manteno

Townships

Cass Township
Center Township
Clay Township
Douglas Township
Fairview Township
Greeley Township
Grove Township
Jackson Township
Jefferson Township
Lincoln Township
Monroe Township
Polk Township
Shelby Township
Union Township
Washington Township
Westphalia Township

Population ranking
The population ranking of the following table is based on the 2020 census of Shelby County.

† county seat

Politics

See also

Shelby County Courthouse
National Register of Historic Places listings in Shelby County, Iowa

References

External links

Shelby County government's website

 
1851 establishments in Iowa
Populated places established in 1851